Paul Benedict (September 17, 1938 – December 1, 2008) was an American actor who made numerous appearances in television and films, beginning in 1965. He was known for his roles as The Number Painter on the PBS children's show Sesame Street and as the English neighbor Harry Bentley on the CBS sitcom The Jeffersons.

Early life 
Benedict was born in Silver City, New Mexico, the son of Alma Marie (née Loring), a journalist, and Mitchell M. Benedict, a doctor, and grew up in Massachusetts, where he graduated from Boston College High School and Suffolk University. Benedict served a tour of duty in the United States Marine Corps. His oversized jaw and large nose were partially attributed to acromegaly; he was first diagnosed with it by an endocrinologist who saw Benedict in a theatrical production.

Film and TV work
Norman Lear cast Benedict as a Zen Buddhist in Cold Turkey, which was completed in late fall 1969 but not released until February 1971. Benedict would go on to work with Lear in the coming years on various television projects.

Benedict was best known for his role as Harry Bentley on the television series The Jeffersons. He played this role from the series' inception in 1975 until 1981, and then returned in 1983 and remained until the end of the series in 1985. His character was a well-mannered Englishman who lived in the apartment next door to George and Louise Jefferson. He worked at the United Nations as a translator and was a bachelor. He was liked by all of the characters on the show except George Jefferson, who found him annoying, but they eventually became friends as the show progressed. Harry was also known for telling boring, pointless stories about his past, particularly about his childhood and relatives in England. 

Benedict played the recurring character The Number Painter on the long-running children's PBS show Sesame Street.

Benedict played the father of a fugitive teen runaway in the 1971 film Taking Off, which was Miloš Forman’s first American film. In the same year he had a small role as a food vendor in They Might Be Giants, starring George C. Scott. Perhaps his best-known movie role from that period was that of Reverend Lindquist in Sydney Pollack's 1972 film Jeremiah Johnson, starring Robert Redford.

In the 1974 film The Front Page, Benedict appeared as Plunkett, the emissary of the governor. In Dino De Laurentiis' Mandingo (1975), he played a slave trader opposite James Mason and Perry King. In the movie The Goodbye Girl (1977) starring Richard Dreyfuss and Marsha Mason, Benedict played the stage director of a production of Richard III in which Richard III was to be portrayed as a stereotypical gay man. He was the patiently eccentric butler in Dr. Necessiter's Gothic-castle apartment in The Man With Two Brains (1983), and had a short scene in the mockumentary This Is Spinal Tap (1984), playing Tucker Smitty Brown, the awkward hotel desk clerk who checks in the band. Called a "twisted old fruit" by the band's manager Ian, he replies, "I'm just as God made me, sir."

In 1988, Benedict played Fairchild, Dudley Moore's butler in the movie Arthur 2: On the Rocks, the sequel to the hit 1981 film Arthur. That same year, in the film Cocktail, he portrayed a condescending business college professor. In the 1990 film The Freshman, he played a similar role, this time an NYU film school professor. In 1991, he starred in The Addams Family as the grouchy judge George Womack. He also made an appearance as the incorrectly assumed title character in the 1996 film Waiting for Guffman, another mockumentary involving many of the same writers and actors as This Is Spinal Tap. He also played Fay's father in the story of Rumpelstiltskin in the Between the Lions episode "Hay Day". He also appeared on the TV show a Different World, season 4 episode 8 as Mr. Ludlow.

Benedict appeared in a 1998 Seinfeld episode as a magazine editor with The New Yorker who was questioned by Elaine about a cartoon in the magazine. His final television appearance was a guest spot on The Drew Carey Show in 2002.

Theater
Following his graduation from Suffolk University in his hometown of Boston, Benedict began acting at the Theatre Company of Boston and performed with Robert De Niro, Dustin Hoffman and Al Pacino.

In addition to his varied film and television roles, Benedict was an accomplished theater actor, having appeared on Broadway multiple times, notably in Eugene O'Neill's two-character play Hughie in 1996 (performing with Al Pacino) at the Circle in the Square Theater, and more recently in The Music Man in 2000–2001. He appeared Off-Broadway in 1986 in Terrence McNally's It's Only a Play. He had directed a production of the work Off-off-Broadway several years before.

In 2007, Benedict performed as "Hirst" in Harold Pinter's No Man's Land at the American Repertory Theater in Cambridge, Massachusetts.

Benedict directed Frank D. Gilroy's Any Given Day on Broadway. Off-Broadway, he directed the original production of Terrence McNally's Frankie and Johnny in the Claire de Lune, and Kathy Najimy's and Mo Gaffney's The Kathy and Mo Show, which won an Obie Award.

Death
On December 1, 2008, Benedict was found dead of a brain hemorrhage at his home in Aquinnah, Martha's Vineyard, Massachusetts. He was 70 years old.

Benedict was awarded a posthumous Elliot Norton Award by the Boston Theater Critics Association in 2009.

Filmography

References

External links 

 
 
 
 
 
 Paul Benedict article at Somerville, MA "Wicked Local" Off-Broadway weblink about No Man's Land

1938 births
2008 deaths
20th-century American male actors
21st-century American male actors
American male film actors
American male television actors
Male actors from New Mexico
People from Silver City, New Mexico
People with acromegaly
Suffolk University alumni